The Uxbridge Bruins are a Junior ice hockey team based in Uxbridge, Ontario, Canada.  They play in the  PJHL Provincial Junior Hockey League.

History
The Uxbridge Bruins joined the Central Ontario Junior C Hockey League in 1975.  The Bruins entered into an era where the league was made very competitive by future Junior "A" teams like the Bowmanville Eagles and Lindsay Muskies. For the 2016-17 season the COJCHL became the Orr Division of the Provincial Junior Hockey League.

The early years were not kind to the Bruins, but the tide began to turn in the 1990s.

The 1990-91 season saw the Bruins finish with a record of twenty-two wins, eleven losses, and three ties.  That record clinched them their first regular season crown.  The Bruins went on to win their first ever league championship.

In 1995-96, the Bruins once again came to life.  With a record of twenty-nine wins, eight losses, three ties, and two overtime losses, Uxbridge found themselves on top of the pile again.  The Bruins went on to win their second league championship, but again failed to make a dent in provincials.  A season later, the Bruins had an even better record but failed to win their league.

The 2001-02 season proved to be a special one.  The Uxbridge Bruins won the regular season crown with thirty-one wins and went on to win the league championship.  Their third championship launched them deep into the All-Ontario playoffs for the Clarence Schmalz Cup.  They made it to the provincial finals just to find one team in their path: the Great Lakes Junior C Hockey League's Essex 73's.  The series was long and was fought hard, as well it went the distance.  The Bruins, one game away from their first Clarence Schmalz Cup, just could not do it in Game 7 losing 2-1 and the series 4-games-to-3.

In 2004-05, the Bruins won the regular season crown and their fourth league championship.  Upon reaching the provincial championship they met the Empire B Junior C Hockey League's Amherstview Jets in the All-Ontario quarter-final.  The Bruins made quick work of them, sweeping them 4-games-to-none.  In the provincial semi-final, the Bruins drew the Niagara & District Junior C Hockey League's Grimsby Peach Kings.  The Peach Kings proved to be a dominant opponent and went on to win the series 4-games-to-1 and then later the Clarence Schmalz Cup as provincial champions.

The Bruins finished the 2005-06 season in third place.  In the league semi-final, the Bruins challenged the second seeded Little Britain Merchants.  The series went the distance, with Uxbridge coming out on top in Game 7 and winning the series 4-games-to-3.  In the league finals, the Bruins met the first seeded Port Perry Mojacks.  The Mojacks defeated Uxbridge 4-games-to-2.

The 2006-07 was somewhat dismal for the Uxbridge Bruins.  After finishing in fourth place, the Bruins were forced to play a quarter-final series against the last place Georgina Ice.  The Bruins squeaked out of that series with a 3-games-to-2 series win.  In the league semi-final, the Bruins then ran into the first seeded Lakefield Chiefs.  The Chiefs made quick work of the Bruins, sweeping them 4-games-to-none.

Season-by-season results

Schmalz Cup Finals appearances
2002: Essex 73's defeated Uxbridge Bruins 4-games-to-3

External links
Bruins Webpage

Ice hockey teams in Ontario